The Eswatini women's national cricket team represents the country of Eswatini (formerly known as Swaziland) in women's cricket matches.

In April 2018, the International Cricket Council (ICC) granted full Women's Twenty20 International (WT20I) status to all its members. Therefore, all Twenty20 matches played between Eswatini  women and another international side after 1 July 2018 were a full WT20I.

Records and Statistics 

International Match Summary — Eswatini Women
 
Last updated 31 July 2022

Twenty20 International 

T20I record versus other nations

Records complete to WT20I #1182. Last updated 31 July 2022.

See also
 Eswatini national cricket team
 List of Eswatini women Twenty20 International cricketers

References

Women's
Women's national cricket teams
Cricket